VND commonly refers to Vietnamese đồng, the currency of Vietnam.

VND may also refer to:

 Variable neighborhood descent, an extension of Variable Neighborhood Search
 Vendor tree prefix (vnd.), an internet media type definition
 Ventral nervous system defective (vnd), a gene in Drosophila fruit flies
 Virulent Newcastle disease

See also 
 UND (disambiguation)